is a 2015 Japanese drama film directed by . It was released on June 20, 2015. The film is an adaptation based on a novel by the same name written by Edward Mooney, Jr., and published by Sourcebooks (Naperville, Illinois).  The Japanese translation is entitled Ishi o Tsumu Hito, from Shogakukan.

Atsushi (Koichi Sato) and Ryoko (Kanako Higuchi) are a married coupled. They decide they want to live around nature and move to Biei in Hokkaido, Japan. Atsushi isn't sure what to do with his free time, so Ryoko asks him to build a stone wall around their house. Atsushi experiences tragedy, but later gets closer to his estranged daughter, Satoko (Keiko Kitagawa). Atsushi continues building the stone wall.

Plot

Cast
Kōichi Satō
Kanako Higuchi
Keiko Kitagawa
Shūhei Nomura
Hana Sugisaki

Kenta Satoi
Yoshinori Okada
Yō Yoshida
Akira Emoto

Reception
Hana Sugisaki won the award for Best Newcomer at the 37th Yokohama Film Festival for The Pearls of the Stone Man and Pieta in the Toilet.

Kanako Higuchi won the Best Actress award at the 40th annual Brussels International Film Festival for The Pearls of the Stone Man.

References

External links
 
Official website of the author - Edward Mooney, Jr.

2010s Japanese films
2015 drama films
2015 films
Japanese drama films
Shochiku films
Films scored by Taro Iwashiro